Aigle River may refer to:

 Aigle River (Doda Lake), Quebec, Canada
 Aigle River (Desert River tributary), Quebec, Canada

See also
Aigle (disambiguation)
Eagle River (disambiguation)